Sevenia umbrina, the ochreous tree nymph, is a butterfly in the family Nymphalidae. It is found in Guinea, Burkina Faso, Sierra Leone, Ivory Coast, Ghana, Togo, Benin, Nigeria, Cameroon, the Democratic Republic of the Congo, Uganda, western Ethiopia, western Kenya, western Tanzania and northern Zambia. The habitat consists of forests, forest margins and riparian vegetation.

Adults are attracted to fermenting fruit.

References

Butterflies described in 1892
Biblidinae
Butterflies of Africa